Modena is a city in northern Italy.

Modena may also refer to:

Places
Duchy of Modena and Reggio
El Modena, California
Modena, Illinois
Modena, Missouri
Modena, New York
Modena, Pennsylvania
Modena, Utah
Modena, Wisconsin, a town
Modena (community), Wisconsin, an unincorporated community
Province of Modena, Italy

Transportation
Ferrari 360 Modena, a model of the Ferrari 360
Modenas, a Malaysian motorcycle company

Sports

Modena F.C. 2018, a football club in Modena, Italy
Modena (racing team),  a Formula One team from Modena, Italy

Buildings
Duomo di Modena, a cathedral in Modena, Italy
Palais Modena, a palace in Vienna, Austria

People
Fiammetta Modena (born 1965), Italian politician
Mary of Modena, queen consort of King James II of England and VII of Scotland
Leon of Modena (1571-1648), Jewish scholar
Stefano Modena (born 1963), Italian Formula One driver
Wiligelmus, Gulielmo da Modena, or Guglielmo da Modena (1099? - 1120), Italian sculptor
William of Modena, Bishop of Modena in 1221
List of Dukes of Ferrara and of Modena

Other
Modena pigeon, a breed of domestic pigeon
Gospel Book (Modena, Biblioteca Estense, Gr. I), a late tenth century illuminated Byzantine Gospel Book
Modena City Ramblers, an Italian folk-rock band
University of Modena and Reggio Emilia
37 Mountain Infantry Division Modena, an Italian division of World War II